Habib Bektaş (Salihli, 1 March 1951) is a German-Turkish writer who has lived in Germany since 1972.

He lives with his wife in Erlangen and he has two adult children. In Germany he has worked in several places (restaurants, pharmaceutical enterprises...) and as a columnist of the journals Evrensel and Yeni Hayat.

Prizes
 1982: Kulturförderpreis der Stadt Erlangen
 1989: Romanpreis des Milliyet Verlagshauses für den Roman Hamriyanım
 1997: Romanpreis des İnkılap Verlages für den Roman Gölge Kokusu
 2000: Türk Dil Derneği Ömer Asim Aksoy Preis des Instituts für die türkische Sprache für den Roman Cennetin Arka Bahçesi

Works 
 1989 Yorgun Ölü, Yaba Verlag, Ankara
 1989 Hamriyanım, Remzi Verlag, Istanbul
 1981 Belagerung des Lebens, Ararat Verlag Berlin
 1983 Erlangen şiirleri, Derinlik Verlag, Istanbul
 1984 ohne dich ist jede stadt eine wüste, Damnitz-Verlag, München
 1985 Reden die Sterne, Damnitz-Verlag, München
 1985 Adresinde yoktur, Dayanışma Verlag, Ankara
 1989 Das vergessene wachsen, art-direct Verlag Erlangen,
 1991 Das Länderspiel, Heliopolis-Verlag, Tübingen
 1991 Uyuşturucu Batağı, Milliyet Verlag, Istanbul
 1991 Mein Freund, der Opabaum, Boje Verlag, Erlangen
 1991 Şirin wünscht sich einen Weihnachtsbaum, Ravensburger-Verlag
 1992 Sözü Yurt Edindim, Broy Verlag, Istanbul
 1994 Metin macht Geschichten, Boje Verlag, Erlangen
 1996 wie wir Kinder (Kindergedichte für Erw.), Verlag der Ev.-Luth. Mission Erlg
 1997 Zaghaft meine Sehnsucht, Horlemann Verlag, Bonn
 1997 Alamancı Metin, Kultusministerium der Türkei, Ankara
 1997 Gölge Kokusu, İnkılap Verlag, Istanbul
 1997 Meyhane Dedikleri, İnkılap Verlag, Istanbul
 2000 Cennetin Arka Bahçesi, Can Verlag, Istanbul
 2001 Ben Öykülere İnanırım, Can Verlag, Istanbul
 2002 babel zum trotz, Horleman Verlag, Bonn
 2005 Ein Gewöhnlicher Tag, Sardes Verlag, Erlangen
 2006 Ein Päckchen `H`, Sardes Verlag, Erlangen
 2006 Farbe des Lichts, Sardes Verlag, Erlangen
 2007 Hamriyanım – Frau Teig, Sardes Verla
 2008 Hinterhof des Paradieses (Roman) Sardes Verlag, Erlangen
 2008 Ein Gedicht, ohne Widmung, Sardes Verlag, Erlangen
 2009 Das Gedächtnis der Spiegel,€ Sardes Verlag, Erlangen
 2010 Ay Terazin Olsun, Yasak Meyve Verlag, İstanbul

External links and references 
 DNB 
 https://web.archive.org/web/20120409190245/http://www.habibbektas.com/

1951 births
Living people

Turkish writers
Turkish emigrants to Germany
German male writers